Guling is a town of Mashan County, Guangxi, China. , it has one residential community and 13 villages under its administration.

References

Towns of Guangxi
Mashan County